Matthew Wolfe Davidson is a United States Air Force major general who serves as the deputy commander of the Air Force Special Operations Command. He most recently served as the director for operations of the Air Force Special Operations Command. Before that, Davidson served as deputy commander of the Special Operations Joint Task Force – Afghanistan, and once served as deputy commander of the Combined Force Space Component Command of the United States Space Command and vice commander of the Space Operations Command, United States Space Force. He was also previously assigned as executive officer to the Chief of Staff of the United States Air Force from June 2016 to April 2018. He was replaced by Michael E. Conley in June 2015.

Davidson is a 1993 graduate from Oklahoma State University's Reserve Officer Training Corps program. He is a career Special Tactics Officer and has led special operations forces during operations Provide Comfort II, Assured Response, Joint Endeavor, Enduring Freedom – Philippines, Enduring Freedom and Iraqi Freedom. He commanded at the squadron, group and wing levels and led joint operations as the Chief of Staff for Special Operations Command Central. Prior to assuming his current assignment, Davidson served as the Executive Officer to the Air Force Chief of Staff.

Education 
 1993 Bachelor of Science, Geography, Oklahoma State University, Stillwater
 1999 Squadron Officer School, Maxwell Air Force Base, Alabama
 2004 Air Command and Staff College, Maxwell AFB, Ala., by correspondence
 2004 Master of Science, International Relations, Troy State University, Alabama
 2005 Army Command and General Staff College, Fort Leavenworth, Kansas
 2006 Master of Military Art and Science, School of Advanced Military Studies, Fort Leavenworth, Kansas
 2007 Air War College, Maxwell AFB, Ala., by correspondence
 2012 Woodrow Wilson International Center for Scholars, Washington, D.C.
 2014 Joint Forces Staff College, Norfolk Naval Station, Va.

Assignments 
 January 1994–December 1994, Special Tactics Training Pipeline
 December 1994–August 1997, flight commander, 23rd Special Tactics Squadron, Hurlburt Field, Florida
 August 1997–August 1998, assistant director of Operations, 720th Special Tactics Group, Hurlburt Field, Florida
 August 1998–January 2002, flight commander, 24th Special Tactics Squadron, Pope Air Force Base, North Carolina
 January 2002–May 2003, director of operations, 320th Special Tactics Squadron, Kadena Air Base, Japan
 May 2003–June 2004, commander, 320th Special Tactics Squadron, Kadena AB, Japan
 June 2004–June 2005, U.S. Army Command and General Staff College, Fort Leavenworth, Kansas
 June 2005–June 2006, School of Advanced Military Studies, Fort Leavenworth, Kansas
 June 2006–June 2008, Air and Space Strategist, headquarters Air Force, Project CHECKMATE, the Pentagon, Arlington, Virginia
 June 2008–June 2009, deputy commander, 24th Special Tactics Squadron, Pope AFB, North Carolina
 June 2009–April 2011, commander, 24th Special Tactics Squadron, Pope AFB, North Carolina
 April 2011–June 2012, commander, 724th Special Tactics Group, Pope Army Field, North Carolina
 June 2012–June 2013, Fellow, Woodrow Wilson International Center for Scholars, Washington, D.C.
 June 2013–June 2014, chief of staff, Special Operations Command Central Forward headquarters, Al Udeid Air Base, Qatar
 September 2014–June 2016, commander, 24th Special Operations Wing, Hurlburt Field, Fla.
 June 2016–April 2018, Executive Officer to the Air Force Chief of Staff, the Pentagon, Arlington, Virginia
 April 2018–August 2019, vice commander, 14th Air Force, Vandenberg AFB, Calif.
 August 2019–December 2019, Deputy Combined Force Space Component Commander, U.S. Space Command, and Vice Commander, 14th Air Force, Air Force Space Command, Vandenberg AFB, California
 December 2019–April 2020, Deputy Combined Force Space Component Commander, U.S. Space Command, and Vice Commander, Space Operations Command, U.S. Space Force, Vandenberg AFB, California
 April 2020–April 2021, deputy commanding general, NATO Special Operations Component Command- Afghanistan/Special Operations Joint Task Force-Afghanistan
 April 2021–present, director of operations, Air Force Special Operations Command, Hurlburt Field, Florida

Awards and decorations

Effective dates of promotion

References 

 

 

 

|-

Living people
Year of birth missing (living people)
Place of birth missing (living people)
Space Operations Command personnel
United States Air Force generals
Recipients of the Defense Superior Service Medal
Recipients of the Legion of Merit
Brigadier generals
Oklahoma State University alumni